Sylphide Charity Vaigncourt-Strallen (born 1 November 1990), known professionally as Zizi Strallen, is a British actress, singer and dancer best known for playing Mary Poppins in the Cameron Mackintosh theatrical production of Mary Poppins.

Personal life
She has three sisters, Scarlett Strallen, Summer Strallen and Saskia 'Sasi' Strallen, all of whom are actresses. Her sister Scarlett also previously played Mary Poppins during the Broadway, West End and Sydney production of Mary Poppins.
She is the daughter of Sandy Strallen and Cherida Langford.
She is also the niece of Broadway and television actress Bonnie Langford.

Career
Strallen appeared Off West End in the Menier Chocolate Factory production of Merrily We Roll Along as Meg Kincaid in 2013.

In 2015, Strallen performed the role of Lana in Matthew Bourne's The Car Man, for which she won Outstanding Female Performance (Modern) at the National Dance Awards.

Strallen played the role of Young Phyllis in Follies in the West End at the National Theatre from September 2017 to November 2017.

She appeared as Fran in the musical Strictly Ballroom in the West End in March 2018 at the Piccadilly Theatre. The Standard reviewer wrote: "The best news, by far, is Strallen, who exudes a lightness and brightness even when a mere face in the dance studio crowd early on. Her acting and dancing is impeccable..."

Strallen is currently starring in the title role in the West End revival of Mary Poppins, which premiered in autumn of 2019 at the Prince Edward Theatre. She had previously played the role of Mary Poppins in the UK and Ireland tour of the musical starting in October 2015.

Strallen appeared in the 2019 fantasy film Cats as Tantomile.

Filmography

Film

Television

Stage

Awards and nominations

References

External links
 

British musical theatre actresses
Living people
1990 births
20th-century British actresses
21st-century British actresses